Disallowance and reservation are historical constitutional powers in Canada that act as a mechanism to delay or overrule legislation passed by Parliament or a provincial legislature. In contemporary Canadian history, disallowance is an authority granted to the governor general in council (federal cabinet) to invalidate an enactment passed by a provincial legislature. Reservation is an authority granted to the lieutenant governor to withhold royal assent from a bill which has been passed by a provincial legislature. The bill is then "reserved" for consideration by the federal cabinet.

In Canadian constitutional law, the powers of reservation and disallowance of federal legislation still formally remain in place in Sections 55 and 56 of the Constitution Act, 1867, and are extended to provincial legislation by Section 90. The initial intent of disallowance, and its practice for the first few years of Confederation, was considered a means of ensuring constitutional compliance.

Since Confederation in 1867, the Government of the United Kingdom has only disallowed one federal law, while the government of Canada has disallowed 112 provincial laws, with the most recent instance occurring in 1943 when Alberta's law that limited land sales to Hutterites and other "enemy aliens" was invalidated. The power of reservation has been exercised 21 times by the governor general, all before 1878, and 70 times by various lieutenant governors, with the most recent case in Saskatchewan in 1961 when the lieutenant governor reserved assent on a bill related to mining contracts.

General principles

Canada is a federation with eleven components: the national Government of Canada and ten provincial governments. These eleven governments derive their authority from the Constitution of Canada. There are also three territorial governments in the far north, which exercise powers delegated by the federal Parliament. Each jurisdiction is generally independent from the others in its realm of legislative authority. The division of powers between the federal government and the provincial governments is based on the principle of exhaustive distribution:  all legal issues are assigned to either the federal Parliament or the provincial Legislatures. In Canada, Parliament is composed of two legislative chambers, the elected House of Commons and the appointed Senate, and together with the Governor General acting as the representative of the Crown. In provinces, the Legislature is composed of one chamber, an elected group of representatives, overseen by the Lieutenant Governor appointed by the Governor General on the advice of the federal government, with the duty of acting as the representative of the Crown for the province. Once a bill has passed through the chamber(s), the bill is presented to the governor-general (or lieutenant governor) for assent on the Sovereign's behalf.

Disallowance 
Disallowance is the decision by a representative of the Crown to veto an enactment of a parliament or a provincial Legislature, and the enactment ceases to operate as law. The authority to disallow an enactment of federal Parliament is derived under section 56 of the Constitution Act, 1867, and held by one of the Secretaries of State in the government of the United Kingdom. Following colonial reforms in the 1930s convention dictates that the government of the United Kingdom is not capable of utilizing disallowance without the approval of the Canadian federal cabinet.

The authority to disallow an enactment of a provincial Legislature is derived under section 90 of the Constitution Act, 1867 and held by the governor general acting on the advice of the Canadian federal cabinet (e.g., governor general in council). Depending on the type of enactment, the decision to disallow the enactment must be made within one year of the governor general's receipt of the enactment from the lieutenant governor.

The power of disallowance is not retroactive, so any action lawfully done under an act's terms before the act has been disallowed remains legal. This principle was outlined in the Judicial Committee of the Privy Council decision in Wilson v. Esquimalt and Nanaimo Railway Co. following Robert Borden's disallowance of an amendment to the Vancouver Island Settler's Rights Act passed by the British Columbia Legislature.

Reservation 
Reservation is the decision by a representative of the Crown to withhold royal assent from an enactment of Parliament under section 55 of the Constitution Act, 1867, or a provincial legislature under section 90 of the Constitution Act, 1867. In the federal context, this meant the governor general was formally instructed in certain circumstances to reserve a bill for the sovereign's "pleasure", or may do so under their own discretion. That is, the governor-general would neither assent nor refuse assent to the bill, but would instead refer it to the secretary of state for the colonies in the United Kingdom for consideration by the Privy Council; assent, if then given, would be by the Queen-in-Council.

Changing use 

Today the powers of disallowance and reservation while still operative, are generally considered dormant, prompting some debates about whether they have effectively become obsolete through disuse. Comparative public law scholar Richard Albert has argued that both powers have fallen into "constitutional desuetude", which occurs "when an entrenched constitutional provision loses its binding force upon political actors as a result of its conscious sustained nonuse and public repudiation by preceding and present political actors". A similar view is shared by Canadian political scientist Andrew Heard who considers the powers reflecting the values of a "bygone era", and no longer align with the Canadian views of federalism. Canadian political scientist Peter H. Russell agrees that the powers have become politically "unusable" as Canadian understanding of federal-provincial relations has moved from a superior-subordinate relationship, to one of equals who coordinate with each other.

Federal enactments

Disallowance of federal legislation 
The power of disallowance and reservation for an Act of the Parliament of Canada is provided to the King-in-Council (Privy Council of the United Kingdom) under section 56 of the Constitution Act. The only incidence of the King-in-Council using this authority occurred in 1873 when the Oaths Act, 1873 was disallowed. The Oaths Act, 1873 was passed in the aftermath of the Pacific Scandal and would have permitted parliamentary committees to examine witnesses under oath, which was not permissible under the British North America Act. Recognizing the importance of this issue, the British North America Act was subsequently amended by the Parliament of the United Kingdom with the Parliament of Canada Act, 1875 which amended section 18 of the British North America Act to provide the Canadian Parliament with the same privileges afforded the Parliament of the United Kingdom, including the authority to examine witnesses under oath. The Canadian Parliament subsequently passed a new Oaths Act.

Political scientist Andrew Heard argues that disallowance of federal law has been effectively forbidden by constitutional convention in Canada since 1942 when the Governor General was no longer permitted to forward Acts of Canadian Parliament to the government of the United Kingdom. 

The Constitution Act stipulates that the government of the United Kingdom has two years to disallow a law after receiving an official copy of it. However, an Act of the Canadian Parliament cannot be disallowed under Section 56 because it cannot be received by the British government. This convention was further strengthened first by the Letters Patent, 1947, which eliminated the Governor General's obligation to send official copies of laws to the government of the United Kingdom; and secondly by the repeal of The Publication of Statutes Act shortly afterwards.

Reservation of federal legislation 
Between 1867 and 1878, 21 federal bills were reserved, six of which were denied Royal Assent by the government of the United Kingdom, and no bills have been reserved since. The 1887 Colonial Conference passed a non-binding resolution stating the governor general of a Dominion nation would never use the power of reservation on the instructions of the government of the United Kingdom. These royal instructions were related to legislation governing eight subjects: authorizing divorce, conferring anything of value to the governor general, creating a new legal tender, committing Canada to an international treaty inconsistent with a British treaty, or containing provisions that were previously disallowed. In 1876, the minister of justice Edward Blake wrote the Secretary of State for Colonies requesting greater independence, and specifically that Britain would not use the power of reservation. Subsequently, the seventh paragraph of the Royal instructions was repealed in 1878 on the insistence of Blake, and La Forest notes that the concept of British control over provincial Legislatures was largely forgotten, and the power of reservation was not used by the government of the United Kingdom again.

In 1931, the Statute of Westminster removed the power of the Parliament of the United Kingdom to create laws that impacted the dominions, unless the dominion specifically asked for it. This Statute effectively eliminated the obligation for certain laws created by the Canadian Parliament to be reserved by the governor general for the approval of the government of the United Kingdom.

Provincial enactments

Disallowance of provincial legislation 

The power of disallowance of an enactment of a provincial Legislature is outlined in the Constitution Act in sections 55 and 90, with the authority resting with the governor general in council. Sections 55 and 90 of the British North America Act does not specify whether the authority rests with the governor general or the governor general in council (e.g., federal cabinet). However, the opinion that the authority rests with the governor general in council was affirmed by Earl Granville, Secretary of State for the Colonies in 1869, and later again affirmed in 1879 by Justice Jean-Thomas Taschereau in Lenoir v. Ritchie, and once again by the Supreme Court in the 1938 Reference re Disallowance and Reservation.

The process for disallowance of an enactment of a provincial legislature begins after the bill has passed third reading in the Legislature and the lieutenant governor has granted royal assent. The Constitution Act requires the lieutenant governor to send a copy of every enactment of the Legislature which has been granted royal assent to the Governor General. For a period of up to one year from receipt of a copy of the enactment, the governor general in council may disallow the legislation. The Constitution Act does not provide a specified period of time for the lieutenant governor to forward a copy of each provincial enactment to the federal government, instructions were first provided in 1892 which gave the lieutenant governor 10 days after royal assent to forward the enactment to the Secretary of State for Canada. These federal timelines were often not followed, and lieutenant governors generally preferred to transmitting all the statutes of a legislative session together. In 1950, the federal government amended the requirements for transmission of provincial enactments to allow the lieutenant governor to send copies at the adjournment of the Legislature.

Disallowance of an enactment of a provincial legislature by the Governor General in Council is facilitated through an Order in Council. The Order in Council is sent to the lieutenant governor of the province with the receipt for the day the provincial enactment was received by the Governor General. In accordance with sections 56 and 90 of the Constitution Act, the lieutenant governor must advise the Legislature of the disallowance, either by speech, message or proclamation. The enactment is officially annulled and no longer a valid law on the day the lieutenant governor advised the Legislature of the disallowance.

Since Canadian Confederation in 1867, 112 provincial enactments have been disallowed by the government of Canada, with the last occurrence in 1943 invalidating Alberta's legislation restricting land sales to Hutterites and other "enemy aliens".

Reservation of provincial legislation 
The process for reservation of a provincial enactment by the lieutenant governor begins following the bill passing third reading in the legislature and being forwarded to the lieutenant governor for royal assent. The lieutenant governor has three options, they may grant royal assent, withhold royal assent on the instructions of the governor general in council, or reserve the bill for approval by the governor general. A bill that is reserved by the lieutenant governor does not become law unless it is granted royal assent within one year of passage. The lieutenant governor is provided "unrestricted" authority to reserve legislation based on the lieutenant governor's discretion, except as instructed by the governor general in council.

Since Confederation, 70 bills passed by a provincial legislature have had royal assent reserved by a lieutenant governor, of which 14 bills of a provincial legislature have been granted royal assent by the governor general.

History of disallowance and reservation 
In his book published by the Canadian department of justice, Gérard La Forest divides this history of Canada following Confederation into five periods based on the use of disallowance. The first period from Confederation in 1867–1881, second period from 1881 to 1896, third period from 1896 to 1911, the fourth period from 1911 to 1924, and the fifth period from 1924 until the publishing of La Forest's book Disallowance and Reservation of Provincial Legislation in 1954. The periods generally correspond to changes in the governing party of Parliament or prime minister.

1867–1881: Macdonald and Mackenzie 

La Forest notes that there have been four main grounds on which provincial enactments have been disallowed: being invalid as they are outside the constitutional responsibilities of the provinces; conflicting with federal policies or interests; conflicting with imperial policies or interests; or being contrary to principles of legislation, including abuse of power, unjust, or otherwise unwise legislation. La Forest notes that invalid enactments due to constitutional responsibilities of provinces was important after Confederation but declined in use, while the second grounds where there is a conflict between federal policies and interests is the most common reason for disallowance. From 1867 to 1881, the governor general disallowed 27 provincial enactments, of which 25 were considered ultra vires of the powers of the provincial Legislatures. La Forest notes that when the minister of justice found an ultra vires provision that was useful or of little importance, they generally communicated their concerns to the Legislature rather than use the power of disallowance. Macdonald was hesitant to disallow enactments that he disagreed with, were petitioned against, or were otherwise disagreeable without a strong legal rationale, a view shared by Liberal successors as minister of justice Edward Blake and Rodolphe Laflamme. Macdonald's view on disallowance changed after 1881, as his government disallowed a growing number of provincial enactments. For instance, Macdonald did not disallow the 1870 enactment of the Ontario Legislature that amended the will of George Jervis Goodhue against the wishes of the trustees and other parties, as Macdonald viewed the Legislature as having the authority to pass this legislation.

Following Confederation in 1867, the Dominion government began the process of interpreting the new British North America Act and determining the responsibilities of each level of government. Parliament passed the Department of Justice Act in 1868, which gave the Minister of Justice the responsibility to examine provincial legislation. Prime Minister John A. Macdonald held the position of Minister of Justice and shortly after the passing of the Department of Justice Act brought forward to Cabinet a report on June 8, 1868, approved as Order in Council P.C. 1868-0611 describing the role of the Department of Justice and government of Canada when utilizing the powers of disallowance and reservation. Macdonald's Order in Council outlined four reasons disallowance would be considered by the department of justice for a provincial enactment: the enactment as a whole is illegal or unconstitutional; the enactment is illegal or unconstitutional in part; in areas of shared federal-provincial jurisdiction the enactment clashes with an Act of Parliament; or the enactment affects the interests of the Dominion negatively. Macdonald's Order in Council also required that the department of justice complete a report on the offending provincial enactment that included the reasons why disallowance was necessary. Macdonald followed his own recommendations closely and produced a report each year listing the provincial enactments he did not find objectional, and a separate report of the provincial enactments he found objectionable based on the criteria in the Order in Council. Macdonald's Order in Council also recommended that the minister of justice communicate with the province of an offending enactment to seek a solution before utilizing the power of disallowance. La Forest notes that despite a report stating that a provincial enactment was considered by the minister of justice to be not objectional, there were instances where those enactments were disallowed. While minister of justice, Macdonald actively drafted these legislative reports with his deputy minister Hewitt Bernard, however the successor liberal minister of justice Antoine-Aimé Dorion wrote his own reports. Dorion's successor Télesphore Fournier had Bernard draft the reports and merely wrote that he concurred on the report.

The first enactment to be disallowed by the Macdonald government was An Act to empower the Police Court in the City of Halifax to sentence Juvenile Offenders to the Halifax Industrial School passed by the Nova Scotia Legislature in 1868. The enactment was disallowed in August 1869 as it dealt with criminal law, which was within the exclusive constitutional jurisdiction of the federal government.

In 1871, a question arose concerning the powers of the governor general, Canadian Cabinet and Parliament following the New Brunswick Legislature passing the Common Schools Act of 1871, which abolished church-run schools, and compelled Catholics to financially contribute to the replacement system of government-run public schools called Common Schools. A majority of the House of Commons attempted to pass a resolution to disallow the act, while Macdonald's Cabinet did not intend to use disallowance. Macdonald viewed the legislation as within the exclusive jurisdiction of the provincial legislature under section 93 of the British North America Act, Macdonald also viewed the New Brunswick government under Premier George Edwin King as friendly to his interests. President of Imperial Privy Council Lord Robinson refused to take action to disallow the enactment at the request Parliament, and responded by affirming that the power of disallowance of provincial enactments is held by the governor general acting on the advice of Canadian Cabinet. The controversy over the New Brunswick Common Schools Act did not fade away as the New Brunswick Legislature was emboldened to pass more provisions strengthening the provisions of the act, and a second resolution for disallowance was passed by the Parliament of Canada in 1873. Macdonald spoke out against Parliament's authority to disallow enactments, and Secretary of State for the Colonies Lord Wodehouse responded to Parliament further reinforcing that disallowance was the responsibility of Canadian Cabinet and the governor general, much to the disappointment of the Liberal members and Edward Blake who moved the resolution. Macdonald allowed the Common Schools Act to stand, and was subsequently affirmed in its validity by the Judicial Committee of the Privy Council decision in Maher v Town Council of Portland.

The first session of the 1st Canadian Parliament saw two bills passed by Parliament on May 22, 1868, and subsequently reserved by Governor General Charles Monck. An Act to fix the Salary of the Governor General reduced the salary of the governor general from $10,000 to $6,500 which was not granted and was not recommended for royal assent by the governor general or by the Secretary of State for the Colonies Marquess of Chandos. The second bill, An Act respecting the Treaty between Her Majesty and the United States of America for the apprehension and surrender of certain offenders received royal assent in June and subsequently became law.

Shortly after Confederation, Macdonald brought forward questions on the power of reservation of lieutenant governors, and whether reservation due to instructions by the government of the United Kingdom through Royal instructions would be evaluated by governor general or the government of the United Kingdom. Lord Granville advised Macdonald that matters of Imperial interest were the purview of the government of the United Kingdom, and the governor general could not provide royal assent to those bills, and this advice was formalized in a July 1869 Order in Council directing lieutenant governors to follow Royal instructions and reserve bills which did not align with those instructions. These instructions were related to legislation governing eight subjects: authorizing divorce, conferring anything of value to the governor general, creating a new legal tender, committing Canada to an international treaty inconsistent with a British treaty, or contain provisions that were previously disallowed. In 1876, the minister of justice Blake wrote the Secretary of State for Colonies requesting greater independence, and specifically that Britain would not use the power of reservation. Subsequently, the seventh paragraph of the Royal instructions were repealed in 1878 on the insistence of Blake, and La Forest notes that the concept of British control over provincial Legislatures was largely forgotten, and the power of reservation was not used by the government of the United Kingdom again.  Albert notes that the additional autonomy provided to Canada made it the most independent British colony, and shortly later in 1878, Parliament passed legislation regarding divorce, a previously forbidden topic without repercussions. As early as 1873, the federal government under Macdonald advised lieutenant governors not to reserve bills which were firmly within the provincial powers to legislate, but were advised to reserve bills if the enactment conflicted with Dominion policy, imperial policy, or were ultra vires. This policy continued with successive ministers of justice. Despite this policy, lieutenant governors continued to reserve bills within the provincial domain and at times the governor general would royal assent. One instance where Macdonald did not recommend for royal assent was an Ontario bill incorporating the Orange Order. Macdonald thought the bill was a political trap by Ontario premier and rival Oliver Mowat, which would either alienate his support with Catholics in Quebec or Protestants in Ontario. Instead of recommending royal assent, Macdonald recommended the Legislature pass the bill again, and the lieutenant governor did not reserve the bill again.

1881–1896: Macdonald, Abbot, Thompson, Bowell and Tupper 

The second period of disallowance and reservation came in 1881 which saw 38 enactments disallowed. The change in disallowance policy that separates this period came with the disallowance of An Act for Protecting the Public Interests in Rivers, Streams and Creeks passed by the Ontario Legislature. La Forest believes the report authored by justice minister James McDonald was actually written by John A. Macdonald, as McDonald would cease his role as justice minister only a few days after its publication. The Ontario enactment was based on a disagreement between two logging firms, one of which owned by prominent conservative Peter McLaren had built dams and other infrastructure on creeks to make it easier to float logs down, and another company sought to use the creek without the permission of the first company. The enactment gave the right to individuals to flow logs down rivers, creeks, and streams, and allowed those who made improvements along a river to receive a toll set by the lieutenant governor from others floating logs down a river. The report on disallowance cited removal property rights from individuals down river who would be forced to become "toll-keeper against his will", which amounted to taking away the "rights of one man and vest them in another" which a Legislatures power to do so was deemed "exceedingly doubtful". The decision to disallow the act went against the principles of Macdonald's 1868 report, and was protested by the Premier of Ontario Oliver Mowat and opposition in Parliament, including Wilfrid Laurier. Further accusations came from the opposition claiming the decision was motivated, as the individual who petitioned for disallowance was a known political friend of Macdonald. The Conservative government was unsuccessful at arguing that this disallowance aligned with previous decisions, and conservative Dalton McCarthy conceded in Parliament that the disallowance was based on a new principle. Macdonald defended the decision on the concept of protecting property rights and it was within the general interest of the Dominion to maintain those rights to ensure continued certainty in investment. The Ontario Legislature protested the disallowance and passed the same Act three more times, all of which were disallowed, and finally the fourth attempt in 1884 which was not disallowed and continued as law. The issue was settled in the landmark case McLaren v Caldwell by the Judicial Committee of the Privy Council.

Following the disallowance of the Ontario act, the minister of justice was inundated with petitions to disallow further acts, La Forest notes that Alexander Campbell who held the role from 1881 to 1885 studied each petition thoroughly, but only disallowed the repeating Ontario Rivers and Streams Acts. Campbell's successor as justice minister John Thompson refused to recommend disallowance for enactments that interfered with property rights similar to the Ontario act in 1881. La Forest notes that Thompson's actions as justice minister were at times inconsistent, disallowing some enactments and refusing to recommend disallowance for similar reasons. Thompson was also very willing to indicate in his reports where he saw an injustice had taken place, and whether or not the injustice was sufficient reason for the enactment to be disallowed. Following Thompson, conservative justice ministers Charles Hibbert Tupper, Thomas Mayne Daly, and Arthur Rupert Dickey refused to disallow an enactment solely on the basis that it was unjust.

During this period, the government of British Columbia passed two enactments restricting immigration of Chinese individuals to the province, and permitting the arrest of new immigrants without a warrant, the enactments both titled An Act to prevent the Immigration of Chinese were disallowed. The British Columbia government had previously lobbied the federal government to require the Canadian Pacific Railway to hire labourers from Europe for railway construction instead of individuals of Chinese descent, and dissatisfied with progress made by the federal government on immigration, British Columbia attempted to regulate immigration under Section 95 of the British North America Act. Minister of Justice Campbell rejected the argument, noting provinces could encourage immigration, but not prohibit immigration, and subsequently disallowed the enactment. Macdonald relented to requests to evaluate the Chinese immigration and appointed the Royal Commission on Chinese Immigration in 1885, which recommended a head tax on Chinese immigrants. The government of British Columbia did not see the recommendations of the Royal Commission as sufficient, and passed legislation duplicating the previous enactment limiting Chinese immigration to the province, which was subsequently disallowed by the federal government.

Another common theme for disallowance during the period of 1881–1896 was provincial enactments that conflicted with Dominion policy, most of which were outside of the powers of the provincial Legislatures. Nearly half of the 38 enactments disallowed during this period were because the enactments interfered with Dominion railway policy. Macdonald disallowed 13 railway charters issued by the fledgling provincial government of Manitoba between 1882 and 1887. the Manitoba government under Premier John Norquay felt that high freight rates were caused by the Canadian Pacific Railway's monopoly, and sought to construct railways connected to the United States border. However, the Macdonald government had previously provided a monopoly to the Canadian Pacific Railway, not permitting any east–west line to be built south of the Canadian Pacific line in Western Canada, this was to protect Canadian Pacific from competition, and support the Macdonald's National Policy. Ten of the disallowed enactments infringed on the Canadian Pacific monopoly directly by chartering competing companies, while two other enactments generally promoted railway construction in Manitoba against the interests of the federal government. James R. Mallory notes the successive disallowances by Macdonald for the Manitoba railway charters hampered what should have been an alliance between conservatives Macdonald and Norquay. Norquay subsequently lost the confidence of his party and resigned in 1887, and the Manitoba Liberal Party under Thomas Greenway took power in the 1888 election. Soon afterward, the Canadian Pacific Railway monopoly was removed in exchange for a financial bailout by the Macdonald government.

Provincial governments were not pleased with what they saw as the increasing interference of the federal government in provincial autonomy, and held the first Interprovincial Conference in Quebec City in October 1887 to discuss the issue, the meeting site was symbolic as had previously hosted the 1864 Conference that laid the basis for the British North America Act. Amongst the issues discussed at the conference was the removal of the federal power of disallowance, to which Quebec Premier Honoré Mercier spoke to as an unnecessary power and that issues of constitutionality of laws "falls naturally within the jurisdiction of the courts". Manitoba Premier Norquay, frustrated by repeated disallowance of railway charters, also challenged the federal powers. The 1887 conference passed two resolutions, one calling for amendments to the British North America Act removing the power of disallowance over topics within the provincial sphere of section 92, and a second resolution calling on the federal government to seek a judicial opinion on each case of disallowance, which would be open to appeal. Macdonald and the federal government were invited to the conference but chose not to attend, the governments of British Columbia and Prince Edward Island which were allies of Macdonald also declined to attend. No action was taken on the first resolution, but Parliament led by a motion by Edward Blake moved to permit the governor general to provide the option to refer these matters to the court for an opinion in 1890, however, without the right of an appeal.

Macdonald's government changed its view on reservation, and in November 1882 created a new standard for reservation to prevent situations of reservation by lieutenant governors on the advice of provincial cabinet. While these standards do not appear to have been forwarded to lieutenant governors until 1887. The new instructions reiterated that lieutenant governors authority for reservation was to be exercised as Dominion officers accountable to the governor general, not provincial cabinet, and further outlined a policy where the federal government preferred to deal with provincial enactments through disallowance if necessary, not reservation. The practice of lieutenant governors reserving bills without instruction from the governor general continued, and was often met with the governor general reiterating this policy back to the lieutenant governor. La Forest notes that fewer bills were reserved after 1882, and those that were reserved did not receive assent from the governor general. Instead the federal government referred the bills back to the respective Legislature to be passed again.

1896–1911: Laurier 
The Liberal victory under Wilfrid Laurier in the 1896 Canadian federal election brought major changes to the use of disallowance by the federal government. In the years prior to the 1896 election, Laurier had made it clear he would not intervene in matters within provincial  jurisdiction, unless the matters intervened with federal policy, and was not supportive of disallowance in circumstances where the enactment was "unjust". During this period, 30 enactments were disallowed, 21 of which were passed by the British Columbia Legislature; however, no enactment was disallowed on the grounds of injustice or inexpediency. Laurier's ideals on federalism and the supremacy of provincial legislatures in constitutionally defined areas was shared by his ministers of justice Oliver Mowat, David Mills, Charles Fitzpatrick, and Allen Bristol Aylesworth. Instead the federal government under Laurier cautioned Legislatures on instances where laws could be considered unjust, but left the matter to be resolved in the Legislature or courts. Despite this supportive view of federalism, the Laurier government had no hesitancy on using disallowance in circumstances where an enactment conflicted with Dominion policy. The Laurier government disallowed laws passed by the British Columbia Legislature which adversely affected immigrants from Asia, as they conflicted with Dominion policy, but also could effect imperial interests and relations between the United Kingdom and Japan. Imperial interests were also recognized in the disallowance of the Ontario Chartered Accountants Act which the British Colonial Office petitioned as it prevented English Institute of Chartered Accountants from using a title they had under British law. Provincial enactments which were considered ultra vires that were seen to not cause considerable harm were not disallowed, and left to the Legislature and courts.

The British Columbia Legislature began introducing legislation prohibiting immigration from Asia in the period of 1900–1908. British Columbia had seen a large reduction in Asian immigration between the late 1880s and early 1890s which resulted in a period with less effort to restrict immigration, however increased immigration in 1899 and 1900 revitalized the call for restrictive immigration legislation in the province. The British government had foreseen the risk of anti-Asian immigration laws damaging imperial relations and trade, and during the 1897 Colonial Conference Secretary of State for the Colonies Joseph Chamberlain expressed concern over the possibility of restrictive legislation in British Columbia. In August 1900, Japan announced voluntary restrictions on emigration to Canada, and a few weeks later the British Columbia Legislature passed the Immigration Act requiring a language test, the enactment was subsequently disallowed nearly a year later by the Laurier government on the grounds of federal paramountcy on immigration after a petition from the Japanese Consul. The British Columbia Legislature passed a similar enactment shortly afterwards which was disallowed six months after its passage. British Columbia continued to pass similar discriminatory legislation throughout 1902–1908 with the understanding the enactments would be disallowed by the federal government; the reasoning by the provincial government was as protest to Ottawa, and to publicly display that immigrants from Asia were not welcome in British Columbia. Imperial interest in disallowance grew with the 1902 Anglo-Japanese Alliance. The British Columbia Legislature was also emboldened with the federal cabinet's slow response to disallow legislation, where during the 1800s, Macdonald's government disallowed enactments without delay, the Laurier cabinet took their time and disallowed enactments could remain enforce for months before disallowance. Bruce Ryder notes that because of these delays by the Laurier cabinet, anti-Asian provincial immigration laws were in force more often in the province than not. In 1907, British Columbia Lieutenant Governor James Dunsmuir reserved royal assent on the new Immigration Act on his accord, and the federal government refused to recommend royal assent. Dunsmuir reasoned that the bill was similar to the previously disallowed enactments, and the bill could interfere with federal interests and international relations. Members of the public rallied against Dunsmuir who previously employed a large number of immigrants from Asia in his coal mines, and his effigy was burned in the 1907 Anti-Oriental Riots in Vancouver. The final attempt by the British Columbia Legislature to regulate immigration from Asia came in 1908, which was made largely inoperable by two court challenges and eventually disallowed by the Laurier cabinet.

In 1911, nearing the end of his period as Prime Minister, Laurier updated the principles for the use of disallowance. Laurier's instructions cautioned "great care" in use and respect for the local Legislatures authority to govern in constitutional areas, but urged expediency in use of disallowance where Legislatures acted in federal constitutional areas where "great confusion and hardship" could come to the public.

1911–1924: Borden and King 
The period of 1911–1924 coincided again with a reduction in use of the powers of disallowance by the federal government, with Borden's conservatives disallowing one enactment, and King's liberal government disallowing five enactments.

The Conservative victory under Robert Borden in the 1911 Canadian federal election ended Laurier's government and resulted in a major change in view for the role of disallowance. Borden appointed Charles Doherty as minister of justice, who had a critical view of Laurier's approach to disallowance and strongly believed that the governor general should disallow an enactment on the grounds it is unjust, interferes with vested rights, or the obligations of a contract. Doherty described his view that disallowance "be properly invoked for the purpose of preventing, not inconsistently with the public interest, irreparable injustice or undue interference with private rights or property through the operation of local statutes intra vires of the legislatures." Despite Doherty's broad view of the application of disallowance, he remained reluctant to recommend use of disallowance. Doherty acknowledged he was limited by federalism and the autonomy of provinces, the desire not to embarrass the legislatures, and the difficulty in understanding the facts and reasons behind the passage of the legislation. Through the Borden years only one statute was disallowed, the 1917 British Columbia amendment to the Vancouver Island Settler's Rights Act, 1904 on the reason that the enactment constituted an invasion of property rights granted by the Dominion government to the Canadian Pacific Railway. Doherty noted that the disallowance aligned with the fourth principle of Macdonald's memo of 1868, and was within the right of the Dominion to disallow the act, further in this particular case, Doherty believed the power of disallowance was necessary to protect the province from passing unwise bills.

The 1921 Canadian federal election saw the liberal party led by Mackenzie King return to power and Lomer Gouin appointed as the new minister of justice. Gouin's opinion on disallowance aligned with those of Doherty, in contrast to the Liberal government under Laurier. Gouin recommended disallowance of the An Act to vest certain lands in Victoria County to Jane E. MacNeil, 1922 passed by the Nova Scotia Legislature, which sought to evade a judgement in McNeil v. Sharpe of the Supreme Court of Canada which the Legislature felt the appellant MacNeil was poorly represented during the trial. The act vested MacNeil with the property taken during her bankruptcy and retroactively disqualified any claims or interests made on the property placed after 1911. Gouin's report concluded the enactment was "extraordinary" and opposed the "principles of right and justice", and that the Nova Scotia Legislature had made "itself a court of appeal from the Supreme Court of Canada". Federal conservative Henry Lumley Drayton introduced a motion to Parliament describing federal interference in the law as an abuse of power and interfering within the constitutional rights of provinces to govern. La Forest notes at this instance the opinion of the Conservative and Liberal parties towards disallowance had flipped from the views previously held from Confederation to 1923. Gouin also disallowed a 1921 Act of the British Columbia Legislature after a petition by the Japanese Counsel General. Gouin referred the act to the Supreme Court who found it was unconstitutional, and Gouin subsequently recommended the disallowance of the act which occurred shortly afterwards.

In a unique case, the Nova Scotia government petitioned Gouin to disallow two enactments, a 1922 amendment to the Act Relating to the Use of the Road and the 1922 amendment to The Motor Vehicle Act which governed the use of roadways in the province. The Legislature inadvertently passed the amendment to the Act Relating to the Use of the Road requiring persons driving to pass on the left, while amendment to The Motor Vehicle Act required drivers to pass on the right. The government of Nova Scotia asked for disallowance due to the confusion it would cause and the "grave danger to life and property", a request which Gouin weighed against options to call a special session of the Legislature or refer to the courts, but in the end decided that disallowance "best met the needs of the case."

1924–1954: King, Bennett, and Laurent 

La Forest describes the final stage for the use of disallowance and reservation to coincide with Ernest Lapointe serving as minister of justice. Lapointe was appointed minister of justice three times, holding the role for over 10 years, with interludes for the Meighen and Bennett governments. With Lapointe, the practice for the minister of justice providing a comprehensive report provincial enactments to be considered for disallowance ended, being replaced with a short special report on those which may be considered for disallowance. Lapointe continued the view that enactments within the provincial constitutional jurisdiction should not be disallowed unless they conflicted with Dominion policy. In his report for Alberta's 1924 An Act to impose a Tax upon Minerals, Lapointe was careful to note that while the act constituted an injustice for the group that petitioned for its disallowance, the reason for recommending disallowance was only because it impeded on federal constitutional jurisdiction. Lapointe continued to allow courts to decide the validity of laws which exceeded the provincial governments constitutional authority to govern.

There were no enactments disallowed by the conservative government of Prime Minister Arthur Meighen in place for three months in 1926 following his appointment after the King–Byng affair.

The conservative government of R. B. Bennett from 1930 to 1935 did not disallow any legislation during their term. La Forest notes that justice minister Hugh Guthrie's reports on questions of disallowance were so brief that it is difficult to determine his personal opinions on when disallowance would be acceptable, except that he subscribed to the belief that the courts should decide the validity of laws which may exceed the provincial governments constitutional authorities.

When King's Liberals were reelected in 1935 Canadian federal election, Lapointe was once again appointed justice minister. La Forest notes that Lapointe began to include in his reports more detail on the circumstances disallowance might properly be used. In his report on Ontario's 1935 The Power Commission Act, which ultimately was not disallowed, Lapointe noted that the then "modern view" of disallowance is incompatible with it being used on provincial legislation which is ultra vires, with the only valid reasons for disallowance being interference with Dominion policy. Lapointe made statements in Parliament echoing his belief, evoking a parallel between Canada's success in seeking autonomy and guarantees during the Imperial Conferences in 1926 and 1930 against the use of disallowance by the government of the United Kingdom, and the relationship between the provinces and federal government. Lapointe went so far as to say he did not think disallowance could easily be used by the federal government.

Lapointe's views on the powers of disallowance and reservation were tested by the government of Alberta under Social Credit Premier William Aberhart. The Aberhart government was elected in 1935 on the pledge to implement Social credit, an economic policy developed British engineer C. H. Douglas which included concepts such as Can$25 monthly dividends. Aberhart's government was slow in implementing economic changes, which resulted in the 1937 Social Credit backbenchers' revolt where members of the legislative assembly revolted openly and threatened to defeat the government in a confidence vote. Aberhart was able to placate the rebellion by promising to implement social credit policies beginning with the Credit of Alberta Regulation Act, the Bank Employees Civil Rights Act, and the Judicature Act Amendment Act. The first required all bankers to obtain a license from the Social Credit Commission and created a directorate for the control of each bank, most members of which would be appointed by the Social Credit Board. The second prevented unlicensed banks and their employees from initiating civil actions. The third prevented any person from challenging the constitutionality of Alberta's laws in court without receiving the approval of the Lieutenant-Governor in Council. All three acts were quickly passed. New Lieutenant-Governor John C. Bowen, asked to grant royal assent, called Aberhart and Attorney-General John Hugill to his office. He asked Hugill if, as a lawyer, he believed that the proposed laws were constitutional; Hugill replied that he did not. Aberhart said that he would take responsibility for the bills, which Bowen then signed. As they left the meeting, Aberhart asked Hugill for his resignation, which he received. The government of Canada found the Alberta enactments highly objectionable, as they attempted to regulate banking which was the constitutional prevue of the federal government. The federal government disallowed all three enactments shortly after. Following the disallowance, the Aberhart government re-introduced the bills under new names Bank Taxation Act (Bill 1), Credit of Alberta Regulation Act, 1937 (Bill 8), and the Accurate News and Information Act (Bill 9).

The Accurate News and Information Act required newspapers to print "clarifications" of stories that a committee of Social Credit legislators deemed inaccurate, and to reveal their sources on demand. Lieutenant Governor Bowen, mindful of the federal government's disallowance of the Social Credit Board's earlier legislation, reserved royal assent of the acts until their legality could be tested at the Supreme Court of Canada. This was the first use of the power of reservation in Alberta history. In Reference Re Alberta Statutes the Supreme Court of Canada struck down the three bills as ultra vires of the province's constitutional authority, affirmed the authority of the lieutenant governor to reserve royal assent, and first proposed the existence of an implied bill of rights protecting civil liberties such as a free press. The Supreme Court in responding to questions posed by the government of Alberta confirmed the validity of disallowance and reservation, with the Court unanimously confirming those powers were still in operation and exercisable. Justice Albert Hudson went so far as to write "there is no room for serious argument" that disallowance and reservation were no longer valid powers.

Despite its loss in the Supreme Court reference, the government of Alberta continued to bring forward legislation which the federal government found objectional. In 1939, An Act to amend the Limitation of Actions Act, 1935 which was meant to change the terms on debt agreement was disallowed, as was another attempt to pass similar legislation a year later. Lapointe died in office in 1941, but his successor as minister of justice Louis St. Laurent continued to recommend the disallowance of Alberta enactments that attempted to regulate banking, including The Debt Proceedings Suspension Act, 1941, The Orderly Payment of Land Debts Act, and the Limitations of Actions Act, 1935, Amendment Act, 1941. The final Alberta enactment disallowed was An Act to prohibit the Sale of Lands to any Enemy Aliens and Hutterites for the Duration of the War which prevented the sale of lands to enemy aliens and Hutterites during the Second World War for security purposes. St. Laurent disallowed the enactment in April 1943 as the obligation of identifying and restricting enemy aliens was an exclusive authority of the federal government. Alberta Premier William Aberhart died shortly afterwards in May 1943, and his successor Ernest Manning slowly backed away from implementing social credit policies. During this period ending with Aberhart's death 11 Alberta enactments were disallowed and three were reserved. The disallowance of Alberta's enemy alien enactment was the last time disallowance was used.

This period was also a period of colonial change for Canada. The unrestricted authority for the government of the United Kingdom to disallow the laws of the Dominions of the British Empire was challenged in the 1926 Imperial Conference, which saw the Balfour Declaration of 1926, and a committee approve a statement which affirmed the right of each dominion government to advise the Crown on its own affairs, and that the government of the United Kingdom should not make a decision against the advice of the dominion government. This was further reinforced by the following 1930 Imperial Conference with the Report of the Conference on the Operation of Dominion Legislation and Merchant Shipping Legislation, 1929 (Cmd 3479), stating that both the prerogative and statutory powers of disallowance had "not been exercised for many years" in relation to dominion legislation. The agreement in 1930 essentially meant the United Kingdom would not reserve or disallow legislation without the approval of the Canadian federal cabinet.

The Balfour Declaration and the 1930 report were non-binding, but were later solidified in the Statute of Westminster 1931 which implemented aspects of the agreements at the imperial conferences, including limiting the legislative authority of the Parliament of the United Kingdom over Canada, effectively giving the country legal autonomy as a self-governing Dominion, though the Parliament of the United Kingdom retained the power to amend Canada's constitution at the request of Canada. The Parliament of the United Kingdom's authority remained in effect until the Constitution Act, 1982, which transferred the authority to amend Canada's constitution to the Parliament of Canada, the final step to achieving full sovereignty. The Statute of Westminster amended the procedure for appointing the governor general, moving from the advice of Privy Council of the United Kingdom to the Canadian Cabinet, removing another aspect of British influence over the Canadian government.

1961: Saskatchewan 
Following the Alberta events in the early-1940s, the power of disallowance has not been used in Canada. The final instance of reservation occurred in 1961 when Lieutenant Governor of Saskatchewan Frank Lindsay Bastedo reserved royal assent of An Act to Provide for the Alteration of Certain Mineral Contracts (Bill 56) at the end of the session during the 14th Legislature. Bastedo reserved the bill on his own accord, and was not instructed to by the governor general in council. The bill passed by the Saskatchewan Co-operative Commonwealth Federation led by Premier Tommy Douglas amended provisions related to mining contracts, and allowed cabinet to modify existing mining contracts. Bastedo argued that he had doubts on the legislation being in the public interest, and the legislation was not legal. Bastedo's view was not shared by his constitutional advisors. The Progressive Conservative cabinet led by Prime Minister John Diefenbaker quickly passed an order in council to grant royal assent.

Consideration of disallowance and reservation after 1961 

The government of Pierre Trudeau faced public pressure to disallow Quebec's Charter of the French Language in 1977, which forbade the use of English language signs and openly contravened some procedural linguistic rights protected by the British North America Act.  Trudeau, a constitutional scholar, demurred, believing that disallowance would ultimately cause more political harm, and that it was better to have the conflicting matters adjudicated. Trudeau believed that disallowance was warranted only for laws that clearly violated federal power or that created disorder beyond the boundaries of the province enacting the law.

In the 1981 Patriation Reference, the Supreme Court found that "reservation and disallowance of provincial legislation, although in law still open, have, to all intents and purposes, fallen into disuse", and the non-use of the powers could evolve into a constitutional convention.

In 2018, the government of Justin Trudeau was formally asked by Toronto City Council to disallow Ontario's pending Efficient Local Government Act (Bill 31), a bill intended to reduce of the number of wards represented in the Toronto City Council after the government's previous attempt to do so was ruled unconstitutional by the Superior Court of Justice. Trudeau declined to intervene in the matter. The Supreme Court held the bill was constitutional in Toronto (City) v Ontario (Attorney General).

In 2019, the Alberta Leader of the Opposition Rachel Notley wrote an open letter to the Lieutenant Governor of Alberta Lois Mitchell asking her to reserve royal assent on the Reform of Agencies, Boards and Commissions and Government Enterprises Act, 2019. The Lieutenant Governor declined.

In 2022, journalist and columnist Andrew Coyne called for federal government to disallow Ontario's Bill 28 Keeping Students in Class Act, which invoked the notwithstanding clause to limit education workers' collective bargaining rights and legislate them back to work.

Proposals for reform 
The proposed Victoria Charter in 1971 included the removal of the powers of disallowance and reservation. Prime Minister Pierre Trudeau was willing to forgo these powers in exchange for a bill of rights which the provinces would be required to adhere to.

Trudeau remained willing to trade the powers of disallowance and reservation for a bill of rights. In 1978, An Act to amend the Constitution of Canada with respect to matters coming within the legislative authority of the Parliament of Canada (Bill C-60) was introduced to the 30th Parliament by the Liberal government under Pierre Trudeau. The bill included a bill of rights which applied exclusively to the federal government. The bill also permitted provinces to opt-in to the bill of rights, and if they did, the powers of disallowance and reservation were repealed or made inapplicable to the province and legislature.

In a 1980 report by the Senate Standing Committee on Legal and Constitutional Affairs, the powers of disallowance and reservation were described as "obsolete" and not compatible with Canadian federalism.

Finally in the final negotiations for the Constitution Act, 1982 Trudeau was able to succeed in entrenching the Charter of Rights and Freedoms into the Constitution, however he was unwilling to remove disallowance and reservation after the provinces negotiated for the notwithstanding clause. Following patriation of the Constitution, the federal government continued to offer to remove the powers of disallowance and reservation in ongoing constitutional talks, including Meech Lake in 1987 and the Charlottetown Accord in 1992. In 1991, the Beaudoin-Dobbie Committee, a committee composed of Senators and members of Parliament chaired by Senator Gerald Beaudoin and Member of Parliament Dorothy Dobbie published a report on what they heard regarding constitutional reforms proposed by the federal government. The report entitled A Renewed Canada called for changes to federal and provincial constitutional jurisdiction and the removal of disallowance and reservation. Canadian political scientist Peter H. Russell views the abolishment of disallowance and reservation as an eventuality and a "logical quid pro quo" for the federal government and provinces in future constitutional reform discussions.

List of provincial laws disallowed by year

Acts disallowed by a governor general

Bills reserved by a lieutenant governor

Notes

References

Bibliography

 
 
 
 
 
 
 
 
 
 
 
 
 

Primary sources

Further reading 

 
 
 
 
 

Constitution of Canada
Federalism in Canada
Westminster system